Simeon Simeonov (born 13 July 1983 in Dobrich) is a former Bulgarian footballer who played as a midfielder.

Career
In 1997, Simeonov joined the CSKA Sofia youth set-up, progressing to the reserve team during the 2001–02 season. He received a call up for the Bulgarian Cup match against Yantra Gabrovo on 24 October 2001, featuring on the bench.

References

1983 births
Living people
Bulgarian footballers
PFC Dobrudzha Dobrich players
Neftochimic Burgas players
PFC Cherno More Varna players
PFC Kaliakra Kavarna players
First Professional Football League (Bulgaria) players
Association football midfielders
People from Dobrich